This is a list of automobile current and defunct automobile manufacturers of the Czech Republic (and Czechoslovakia and Bohemia).

Current manufacturers
 Praga (1907–present)
 Škoda Auto (1925–present)
 Kaipan (1992—present)
 Gordon Roadster (1997-present)
 MWM (2017–present)
 Sigma Motor (2018-present)

Foreign manufacturers building in the Czech Republic
 Hyundai Motor Manufacturing Czech (2008–present)
 Toyota Peugeot Citroën Automobile Czech (2002–present)

Former manufacturers
 4ekolka (2016) (prototype only)
 Aero (1929–1947)
 AKA (1925)
 AM (1948)
 Aspa (1924–1925)
 Avia (1919–present) (no longer manufactures cars)
 Gatter Autowerk Reichstadt (1930–1937)
 Hoffmann & Novague (2008–2021)
 Innotech (1992, prototype only)
 Jawa Moto (1919–present) (no longer manufactures cars)
 Laurin & Klement (1895–1925) (replaced by Škoda Auto)
 MTX (1969–present) (no longer manufactures cars)
 Ocelot Auto (1994–2010)
  (1907–1916, acquired by Laurin & Klement)
  (1896–1908)
 Stelka (1922-1924)
 Tatra (1850–present) (no longer manufactures cars)
 Velorex (1950–1971)
  (1906–1910)
 Walter Fiat (1911–1954) (Walter Aircraft Engines)
 Wikov (1918–1945)
 Zbrojovka Brno (1924–1937)

See also
 List of automobile manufacturers
 List of automobile marques

References

Autombiles
Lists of automobile manufacturers